thumbnail
Augusto Lamo Castillo (25 September 1938 in Badajoz 10 September 2002) was a Spanish football referee. He is known for having refereed one match in the 1982 FIFA World Cup on his home soil in Spain. He also refereed one match in the 1984 UEFA European Football Championship in France.

References

External links 
 
 
 

Sportspeople from Badajoz
Spanish football referees
FIFA World Cup referees
1938 births
1982 FIFA World Cup referees
2002 deaths
UEFA Euro 1984 referees
AFC Asian Cup referees